Antonio Javier Galeano Ferreira (born 22 March 2000), commonly known as Antonio Galeano or simply Galeano, is a Paraguayan professional footballer who plays as forward for Paraguayan Primera División club Cerro Porteño.

Honours
São Paulo
Campeonato Paulista: 2021

References

External links

2000 births
Living people
Sportspeople from Asunción
Paraguayan footballers
Paraguayan Primera División players
Club Rubio Ñu footballers
Campeonato Brasileiro Série A players
São Paulo FC players
Cerro Porteño players
Association football forwards
Paraguayan expatriate footballers
Expatriate footballers in Brazil